The Leader of the House is a position in the Parliament of Sri Lanka and is generally a member of the Cabinet of Sri Lanka who is responsible for arranging government business in the Parliament.

List of Leaders of the House

Parties

See also
Parliament of Sri Lanka 
Cabinet of Sri Lanka

References

External links
Parliament of Sri Lanka - Handbook of Parliament, Leaders of the House

Parliament of Sri Lanka
 Leader of the House